Guangxi University of Science and Technology (GXUT) is a university based in Liuzhou, Guangxi, China.

History 
The university was established in Nanning by the government of Guangxi Zhuang Autonomous Region in 1958. During the period of 1961 to 1982 university operations were suspended. The university was re-established in 1982 by amalgamating with Guangxi Light Industry College, Guangxi Mechanical Engineering College and Guangxi Institute of Petroleum and Chemical Engineering, to form Guangxi University of Technology.

In 1985, the university moved from Nanning, the capital city of Guangxi, to Liuzhou. In 2013, the university merged with Liuzhou Medical College, to form Guangxi University of Science and Technology.

References

External links
Official Website

Universities and colleges in Guangxi
Educational institutions established in 1958
1958 establishments in China